Antonín Holub (born 8 March 1986) is a professional Czech football player who played in the Czech First League for SK Kladno.

References

External links

Czech footballers
1986 births
Living people
Czech First League players
SK Kladno players
FK Dukla Prague players
FK Baník Most players
FK Baník Sokolov players

Association football midfielders